Sergei Nikolayevich Abrosimov (born 5 August 1977) is a Russian former football player.

Club career
He made his Russian Premier League debut for FC Lada Togliatti on 6 November 1994 in a game against FC Zhemchuzhina-Kuban Sochi.

External links
 

1977 births
Living people
Russian footballers
FC Lada-Tolyatti players
Russian Premier League players
Place of birth missing (living people)
Association football defenders